Alexandra Fusai and Nathalie Tauziat were the defending champions, but lost in quarterfinals to Nicole Arendt and Manon Bollegraf.

Conchita Martínez and Arantxa Sánchez Vicario won the title by defeating Amanda Coetzer and Corina Morariu 3–6, 6–2, 7–6(9–7) in the final.

Seeds
The first four seeds received a bye into the second round.

Draw

Finals

Top half

Bottom half

References
 Official Results Archive (ITF)
 Official Results Archive (WTA)

WTA German Open - Doubles